Nitesh Hooda (born 1 May 1999) is an Indian cricketer. He made his List A debut on 27 February 2021, for Haryana in the 2020–21 Vijay Hazare Trophy. He made his first-class debut on 24 February 2022, for Haryana in the 2021–22 Ranji Trophy.

References

External links
 

1999 births
Living people
Indian cricketers
Haryana cricketers
Place of birth missing (living people)